G. H. Mulcaster (27 June 1891 – 19 January 1964) was a London-born British actor. He was the father of the actor Michael Mulcaster, and the first husband of English actress Diana Napier.

Selected filmography

 God Bless Our Red, White and Blue (1918) - The Fiancee
 The Wife Who God Forgot (1920) - Fairfax
 Wild Heather (1921) - John O'Rourke
 The Pipes of Pan (1923) - Irwin Farman
 Mist in the Valley (1923) - Denis Marlow
 The Squire of Long Hadley (1925) - Ronald Neilson
 A Girl of London (1925) - Wilson
 The Wonderful Wooing (1926) - Ronald West
 Sacrifice (1929)
 Inquest (1931) - Charles Wyatt
 Purse Strings (1933) - Edward Ashby
 The Iron Duke (1934) - First Delegate
 The River House Mystery (1935) - Sir John Harpenden
 Second Bureau (1936) - Yvanne Brosilow
 The Five Pound Man (1937) - Sinclair
 Old Mother Riley (1937) - Counsel for Defence
 Little Dolly Daydream (1938) - Warton
 Lily of Laguna (1938) - Gerald Marshall
 The Lion Has Wings (1939) - Controller
 Pack Up Your Troubles (1940) - Col. Diehard
 Night Train to Munich (1940) - Minor Role (uncredited)
 Sailors Don't Care (1940) - Adm. Reynolds
 This Man Is Dangerous (1941) - Lord Morne
 Penn of Pennsylvania (1942) - (uncredited)
 Let the People Sing (1942) - Inspector
 The Dummy Talks (1943) - Piers Harriman
 My Learned Friend (1943) - Dr. Scudamore
 For You Alone (1945) - Rev. Peter Britton
 Under New Management (1946) - William Barclay
 The Courtneys of Curzon Street (1947) - Sir Edward Courtney Sr.
 Spring in Park Lane (1948) - Perkins
 Bonnie Prince Charlie (1948) - The Duke of Newcastle
 That Dangerous Age (1949) - Simmons
 Under Capricorn (1949) - Dr. Macallister
 The Naked Heart (1950) - Le prêtre
 Contraband Spain (1955) - Col. Ingleby
 Lady of Vengeance (1957) - Bennett
 The Hound of the Baskervilles (1959) - Seldon
 Downfall (1964) - Elderly Man (final film role)

References

External links

1891 births
1964 deaths
English male stage actors
English male film actors
English male silent film actors
English male television actors
Male actors from London
20th-century English male actors